Jaime Mohamad Fathi Ashor Siaj Romero (born 16 December 1995) is a professional footballer who plays as a forward for Valour FC in the Canadian Premier League. Born in Spain, Siaj represented Jordan internationally in 2018.

Early life
Siaj began playing youth football with the Escuela de Fútbol AFE. He then played youth football with ED Moratalaz, where he played for half a season. From there, he moved on to the Real Madrid Academy, followed by the Getafe youth system.

College career
In 2014, Siaj began attending Pfeiffer University in the United States, where he played for the men's soccer team. He scored his first goal in his debut on September 5, 2014 against the Millersville Marauders. He was named the Conference Carolinas Men's Soccer Player of the Week for the first time in Week 4 of his freshman season. At the end of his freshman season, he was named to the All-State Second Team and the All-Conference Second Team. 

In his sophomore season, he was named the Conference Carolinas Men's Soccer Player of the Week twice, the National Player of the Week once, and was a selection for First Team All-Region, All-State First Team, and was an All-American Honorable Mention. He scored the overtime winning goal in the semi-finals to advance to the National Championship, where Pfeiffer won the NCAA Division II national title. 

On October 15, 2016, he scored a hat trick in a 4-0 victory over the King Tornado. In his junior season, he was a two time Conference Carolinas Player of the Week, was named First Team All-Conference, Second Team All-America, First Team All-State, and First Team All-Region. He left the school after his junior season to turn professional, becoming the school's first ever player selected in the MLS SuperDraft. Siaj made a total of 69 appearances, scoring 47 goals and tallying 28 assists in his time at Pfeiffer.

Club career
In 2016, he played with the Charlotte Eagles in the Premier Development League.

In January 2017, Siaj was selected in the third round (45th overall) of the 2017 MLS SuperDraft by Colorado Rapids. In April 2017, he signed with Colorado's USL affiliate, the Charlotte Independence.

In February 2018, Siaj signed with OKC Energy FC of the USL for the 2018 season.

In February 2019, Siaj joined the Tampa Bay Rowdies, a team he had previously trialled with during the 2017 preseason, playing in the pre-season 2017 Florida Cup tournament.

He then returned to Spain, joining Segunda División B side Inter de Madrid in 2020.

Later in 2020, he joined Kuwaiti club Khaitan SC.

In September 2021, he joined Italian Serie D side Messina. In December, he departed the club.

On 29 December 2021, Lebanese Premier League side Ansar announced the signing of Siaj.

On 2 September 2022, Siaj joined League of Ireland Premier Division club Finn Harps. The same day as his signing, he made his debut, as a substitute, against St Patrick's Athletic.

In January 2023, he joined Canadian Premier League club Valour FC.

International career
Born in Spain, Siaj has Jordanian heritage through his father.

Siaj was called-up to the national team for the first time in 11 May 2018, ahead of two friendly games against Cyprus and China. He made his debut on 20 May 2018, scoring his first goal in a 3-0 victory over Cyprus.

Career statistics

International
Scores and results list Jordan's goal tally first.

References

External links 
 
 
 
 

1995 births
Living people
Footballers from Madrid
Spanish people of Jordanian descent
People with acquired Jordanian citizenship
Jordanian people of Spanish descent
Spanish footballers
Jordanian footballers
Association football forwards
ED Moratalaz players
Real Madrid CF players
Getafe CF footballers
Pfeiffer Falcons men's soccer players
Charlotte Eagles players
Charlotte Independence players
OKC Energy FC players
Tampa Bay Rowdies players
Internacional de Madrid players
Khaitan SC players
S.S.D. F.C. Messina players
Al Ansar FC players
Finn Harps F.C. players
USL League Two players
USL Championship players
Segunda División B players
Kuwait Premier League players
Serie D players
League of Ireland players
Colorado Rapids draft picks
Spanish expatriate footballers
Spanish expatriate sportspeople in the United States
Spanish expatriate sportspeople in Kuwait
Spanish expatriate sportspeople in Italy
Spanish expatriate sportspeople in Lebanon
Spanish expatriate sportspeople in Canada
Jordanian expatriate footballers
Jordanian expatriate sportspeople in the United States
Jordanian expatriate sportspeople in Kuwait
Jordanian expatriate sportspeople in Italy
Jordanian expatriate sportspeople in Lebanon
Jordanian expatriate sportspeople in Canada
Expatriate soccer players in the United States
Expatriate footballers in Kuwait
Expatriate footballers in Italy
Expatriate footballers in Lebanon
Expatriate association footballers in the Republic of Ireland
Expatriate soccer players in Canada
Jordan international footballers